The Australian Amateur is the national amateur golf championship of Australia. It has been played annually since 1894, except for the war years, and is organised by Golf Australia. Having traditionally been a match play event, from 2021 it has been a 72-hole stroke play event, having last been played as a stroke play event in 1907.

Originally played as the "Victorian Golf Cup" at Melbourne Golf Club, the championship was taken over by the Australian Golf Union in 1899. In its early years, a variety of formats were used but from 1908 to 2020 it was a match play event, generally with a stroke play qualifying stage. The winner receives the Challenge Cup, donated by Lord Forster, the Governor-General of Australia, and first presented to Legh Winser, the 1921 winner.

Three players have won the championship four times: Harry Howden between 1896 and 1901, Michael Scott between 1905 and 1910 and Jim Ferrier between 1935 and 1939. The last repeat winner was Doug Bachli who won his second title in 1962.

History
The championship is reckoned to start in 1894 when the Royal Melbourne Golf Club founded the "Victorian Golf Cup", open to all amateurs in Australasia. The 1894 contest was played on 5, 7 and 9 November with the result decided by a bogey competition over three rounds. Louis Whyte won with a score of 6 holes down on bogey, 6 holes ahead of Mark Anderson. The same format was used for the 1895 event, which was played on 4, 6 and 8 November. Robert Balfour-Melville was even with bogey, 10 holes ahead of Thomas Hope. The Victorian Golf Cup had rapidly established itself as the main golf tournament in Australia, and was regarded as the amateur championship of Australia. The 1896 contest was held from 23 to 25 September and was decided by match-play with the final over 36 holes. Defending champion, Robert Balfour-Melville, met Harry Howden in the final. Howden was 4 up with 5 to play before Balfour-Melville levelled the match at the 35th. However Howden won the last to win by 1 hole. The match play format was not popular and the 1897 event was decided by 72 holes of stroke-play, played on 13 and 15 October. Harry Howden retained the trophy with a score of 348, 33 strokes ahead of William McIntyre. Howden led by 12 after the first day and extended this by a further 21 on the final day. The 1898 event was again decided by stroke-play. Harry Howden was three behind the leaders after the first day but pulled away on the final day and won with a score of 360, 13 ahead of his brother Jim.

The Australian Golf Union was formed in 1898 and organised their first championship meeting at Royal Sydney Golf Club, the main event being the amateur championship on 26 and 27 May 1899. Harry Howden and New Zealander Charles Gillies were level after the first day on 157. Howden led by a stroke after three rounds after Gillies had taken 11 at the fourth hole. The pair were still level with nine holes to play but Gillies came home in 37 to Howden's 48 to win with a total of 314, 11 ahead of Howden, who still took second place. The Victorian Golf Cup continued in 1899 and later, and despite some initial confusion, became established as the Victorian Amateur Championship. Unlike the earlier Victorian Golf Cup, the AGU championship meeting moved each year and in 1900 it was held at Adelaide Golf Club on 28 and 29 June. Louis Whyte won with a score of 382, four ahead of Walter Carre Riddell. The championship returned to the Sydney area in 1901, being played at The Australian Golf Club on 11 and 12 July. Harry Howden won with a score of 352, 7 strokes ahead of Hugh MacNeil, although he had trailed by 5 after the first day. The 1902 championship was played at Royal Melbourne on 22 and 23 October. Hugh MacNeil won with a score of 328, six ahead of Peter Anderson and Walter Carre Riddell. In 1903 the event returned to Adelaide Golf Club, played from 25 to 27 June. The format was revised, there being a 36-hole stroke-play qualification stage after which the leading 8 played match-play with a 36-hole final. Dan Soutar led the qualifying and went on to beat Jim Howden 3&1 in the final.

The first Australian Open was held in 1904 and acted as qualifying for the amateur championship. The leading 16 amateurs played in the match-play stage, over three days, with two 18-hole matches on the first day, followed by 36-hole semi-finals and final. Jim Howden beat Michael Scott 3&2 in the final, despite having finished 23 strokes behind him in the Open. The first Interstate team match was held in 1904, with New South Wales beating Victoria by five matches to two, with one match halved. When the meeting was held at Royal Melbourne in 1905 and 1907 there was no separate match-play stage, the amateur championship being won by the leading amateur in the Open. In 1905 Dan Soutar, a professional, won the Open with a score of 337, 10 strokes ahead of the runner-up, Scott, who therefore became the amateur champion. In 1907 Scott won the Open championship with a score of 318 becoming both open and amateur champion. Scott had to survive a protest, having accidentally driven from outside the teeing ground at one hole. The 1906 event had followed the same format as that in 1904. As in 1904. it was won by a player who had performed relatively poorly in the Open, Ernest Gill beating Clyde Pearce 5&4 in the final.

From 1908 only the leading 8 amateurs qualified for the match-play, with all three rounds played over 36 holes. Generally, the Open finished on a Saturday and the three rounds were played from Monday to Wednesday. In 1908, for scheduling reasons, the final was not played until the Saturday. The Tasmanian Clyde Pearce, having already won the Open, beat Neptune Christoe 10&8 in the final. In 1909 Pearce reached the final again but lost at the 37th hole to Michael Scott. Scott won his fourth title in 1910, beating Jim Howden 10&8 in the final. In 1911 the three match-play rounds were scheduled for Monday, Wednesday and Saturday. Scott had returned to Britain and Jim Howden won his second title, beating Claude Felstead 4&3 in the final. In 1912 the event was won by Hector Morrison, who beat Gordon Burnham, a member of the Governor-General's staff, 3&1 in the final. The 1913 tournament was originally planned to be played at The Australian, but was moved to Royal Melbourne because of a smallpox outbreak and the poor condition of the course, caused by wet weather. It was won by Audley Lemprière who beat Ivo Whitton 2&1 in the final, reversing the result in the Open, in which Whitton had won with Lemprière second.

The championship restarted in 1920 using the pre-war format. Eric Apperly beat Tom Howard 4&3 in the final, while in 1921 Legh Winser beat Bruce Pearce 6&5 in the final. In late 1921 it was announced that Lord Forster, the Governor-General of Australia, had given a Challenge Cup, to be held by the winner until the following championship. The cup was presented to Legh Winser, the 1921 champion, by Archibald Weigall, the Governor of South Australia, at a ceremony at Adelaide Golf Club in April 1922. Ivo Whitton had won the Open in 1912 and 1913 but it was not until 1922 that he won the amateur championship, beating Henry McClelland 3&2 in the final. He repeated his success in 1923 beating Harry Sinclair by the same score. There were 16 qualifiers in 1922, with four 36-hole matches, but the number reverted to 8 in 1923, before expanding again to 16 in 1924 where it stayed until 1939. Alex Russell had won the Open in 1924, beating Whitton on the way to the final, but lost 2&1 to Sinclair, the runner-up in 1923. Sinclair retained the title in 1925 beating George Thompson 12&10 in a one-sided final. Whitton won the Open for the third time in 1926 and then reached the final of the amateur, but was beaten by Len Nettlefold, 2 up. Nettlefold won again in 1928 but otherwise there no multiple winners up to 1934. In the 1920s there had been some variation in the days of the week when the Open and amateur were played but from 1930 they became standardised with the Open finishing on a Saturday and the Amateur being played from Monday to Thursday of the following week. The period from 1935 to 1939 was dominated by Jim Ferrier who won four times in the five years, 1935, 1936, 1938 and 1939. In 1938 he became the first player since Clyde Pearce in 1908 to win both the Open and amateur, a feat he repeated in 1939. His only defeat in this period came in the 1937 quarter-finals where he lost 2&1 to Doug Davies. Harry Williams, the 1931 winner, won again in 1937.

When the championship resumed in 1946 it was played at Royal Sydney, after the Australian Open that had been played there. However, the Open no longer acted as a qualifying event and the amateur championship became match-play only with 18-hole matches except for the final. Alan Waterson beat Jim Pendergast 2&1 in the final. From 1947 the Open and amateur were generally played at different clubs, although they were often played in the same city with the amateur either immediately before or after the Open. Harry Hattersley won his second championship in 1947, 17 years after his first. In 1952 both Open and Amateur championships were held at Lake Karrinyup, the first time either had been held in Western Australia. The format for the amateur championship was revised with a 36-hole stroke-play qualifying event with the leading 32 players playing in the match-play stage. Bob Stevens led the qualifiers with a score of 141 and went on to win the title, beating Bill Higgins 7&6 in the final. Peter Heard won in 1953, having previously won in 1951. The format was revised for 1954 with the event taking place immediately after the Open. The leading 32 amateurs after the first two rounds of the Open qualified, all matches being over 36 holes. The six members of the Australian team that won the Commonwealth Tournament returned in time to play in the amateur championship but too late to play in the Open, and were excluded. The Toogood brothers met in the 1954 final, with Peter beating his brother John, leading to the famous headline "Toogood Was Too Good For Toogood". Harry Berwick was another two-time winner, in 1950 and 1956, beating Bill Edgar in the final on both occasions.

1958 had seen a return to the earlier match-play-only format with 18-hole matches except for the final, but it had not proved popular. In 1959, 36-hole stroke-play qualifying was introduced with the leading 64 players playing in the match-play stage. In 1959 Jack Coogan led the qualifying but lost in the final to Bruce Devlin. Doug Bachli won in 1962, having previously won in 1948. The 1963 event was played soon after the 1963 Commonwealth Tournament in Sydney, resulting in an unusually large number of overseas entries. Two South Africans reached the final, with John Hayes winning a one-sided final. New Zealander Ross Murray reached the final in 1969 but lost 6&5 to Bob Shearer.

There had been some criticism that the existing format was not producing a high calibre of winners, and the format was revised. In 1971 the number of qualifiers was reduced to 16, with all the match-play contests over 36 holes. The change was not immediately successful since only one of the six members of the Australian team for the upcoming Commonwealth Tournament qualified for the match-play stage. For 1972 the number of qualifiers was increased to 32, with all matches still over 36 holes. Colin Kaye won in 1972, the first time a medallist had gone on to win the event since stroke-play qualifying had been introduced in 1959. 18-hole matches were reintroduced in 1973, with only the final over 36 holes. The number of qualifiers remained at 32. The experienced Tony Gresham reached four finals in the 1970s, although he only won once. He beat Chris Bonython at the 40th hole in 1977 but lost to Ray Jenner in 1973, Peter Sweeney in 1976 and Mike Clayton in 1978. Bonython and Terry Gale were other multiple finalists in the 1970s, Gale winning in 1974 and losing to Bonython in 1975.

New Zealander Brent Paterson reached the final in 1983 but lost to Wayne Smith, and it was not until 1985 that there was another overseas winner when Boonchu Ruangkit from Thailand beat Peter O'Malley in the final. Another New Zealander, Phil Aickin, reached the final in 1987 but lost to Brett Johns. In the 1990s there were a number of winners who went on to have successful professional career. Lucas Parsons won in 1991 and was followed by New Zealander, Michael Campbell, in 1992 and Greg Chalmers in 1993. The centenary championship in 1994 was held at Royal Sydney. The event was moved to March, having traditionally been held in the second half of the year, and was won by Englishman Warren Bennett. Mathew Goggin won in 1995, beating the US-based Jamie Crow in the final.

In 1996 the qualifying rounds were extended from 36 to 72 holes, although the number of qualifiers remained at 32. David Gleeson won in 1996 and was followed by Kim Felton, Brett Rumford and Brendan Jones from 1997 to 1999. The early 2000s saw two Scottish winners, Jack Doherty in 2003 and Eric Ramsay in 2005. In 2006 the stroke play stage was turned into a separate tournament, the Australian Amateur Stroke Play Championship. The main difference was that there was a playoff in the event of a tie, whereas previously medalist honours were shared. There was a playoff in four of the six years the events was held. Danny Willett was the only overseas winner of the Stroke Play Championship, winning in 2008, while Norwegian Anders Kristiansen won the Amateur Championship that year. Matt Jager was the only winner of the stroke play who went on to win the Amateur Championship, winning both in 2009. In 2012 the format returned to that used from 1959 to 1970, with the leading 64 players qualifying after 36 holes of stroke-play. Match-play rounds were over 18 holes except for the final, which was over 36 holes. Two courses were used for the stroke play stage, each player playing one round on each course. The 2010s saw a number of overseas winners, Marcel Schneider won in 2012, Tae Koh in 2014, Connor Syme in 2016, Keita Nakajima in 2018 and Conor Purcell in 2019.

From 2021 the event has been played as a 72-hole stroke play event. The 2021 championship was originally planned to be played in Melbourne in January but was rescheduled to February at Kooyonga Golf Club. Louis Dobbelaar won the championship by two strokes from Jeffrey Guan. Jack Thompson led by 5 shots at the start of the final round but took 82 and was later disqualified for signing for an incorrect score. The 2022 title was won by Connor McKinney who holed a long birdie putt at the first extra hole in a three-way playoff.

Winners

All match-play finals have been over 36 holes. A number of early events used different formats. The 1894 and 1895 events were bogey competitions, decided over 3 rounds. From 1897 to 1902 and in 1905 and 1907 the championship was decided by 72 holes of stroke play.

Additional source:

Medallists
From 1959 to 2020 the winner of the stroke play stage was the Australian Medallist. Qualifying was generally over 36 holes. However from 1996 to 2005 it was played over 72 holes. Two courses were used from 1986.

 2020 - Andre Lautee (134)
 2019 - David Micheluzzi (127)
 2018 - Darcy Boyd, Connor McKinney (135)
 2017 - Kevin Yuan (138)
 2016 - Charles Pilon (138)
 2015 - Nick Marsh (136)
 2014 - Ryan Evans (135)
 2013 - Brady Watt (136)
 2012 - Cameron Smith (141)
 2006 to 2011 - replaced by the Australian Amateur Stroke Play Championship
 2005 - Kang Sung-hoon (273)
 2004 - Bradley Iles (282)
 2003 - Mitchell Brown (280)
 2002 - Andrew Buckle (277)
 2001 - Steven Bowditch (283)
 2000 - Warwick Dews (287)
 1999 - Bradley Bone, Brendan Jones (288)
 1998 - Kim Felton (284)
 1997 - Daniel Gaunt, Terry Pilkadaris (281)
 1996 - Jamie Crow (279)
 1995 - Darren Anderson, Marcus Wheelhouse (142)
 1994 - Jason Dawes (142)
 1993 - Steve Collins, Anthony Toogood (138)
 1992 - Stephen Leaney (138)
 1991 - Lucas Parsons (140)
 1990 - Shane Tait (140)
 1989 - Tony Mills, John Wade (145)
 1988 - John Wade, Robert Willis (145)
 1987 - Glenn Joyner (145)
 1986 - Craig Warren (142)
 1985 - Brett Ogle (138)
 1984 - John Hay (147)
 1983 - Wayne Smith (142)
 1982 - Ian Hood, Wayne Smith (149)
 1981 - Tony Gresham (146)
 1980 - Colin Kaye (145)
 1979 - Colin Kaye (144)
 1978 - Elliott Booth (146)
 1977 - Tony Gresham, Colin Kaye (143)
 1976 - Chris Bonython, Bruce Cook, Peter Sweeney, Doug Witham (148)
 1975 - Tony Gresham (140)
 1974 - Elliott Booth, Terry Gale (142)
 1973 - Peter Headland (140)
 1972 - Keith Drage, Colin Kaye, Sommy Mackay (144)
 1971 - Mike Cahill (142)
 1970 - Barry Warren (143)
 1969 - David Good (141)
 1968 - Barry Burgess, Duncan Grant, Bob Shearer (142)
 1967 - Tony Gresham (140)
 1966 - Vic Bulgin (143)
 1965 - Kevin Hartley (140)
 1964 - Noel Bartell (143)
 1963 - Harry Berwick, Eric Routley (144)
 1962 - Tony Hutton (147)
 1961 - Phil Billings (139)
 1960 - Les O'Shea (141)
 1959 - Jack Coogan (141)

Source:

In 1960, Les O'Shea and Eric Routley tied for first place. There was an 18-hole playoff to determine the winner of the medal, O'Shea winning with a 74 to Routley's 76. The next tie was in 1963, when Routley was again involved, this time with Harry Berwick. On this occasion both players received medals.

Australian Amateur Stroke Play Championship
From 2006 to 2011, the stroke play stage was a separate championship, the Australian Amateur Stroke Play Championship, although it also acted as the qualification for the Australian Amateur.

Additional source:

See also
Australian Women's Amateur

References

External links

Amateur golf tournaments in Australia
Recurring sporting events established in 1894
1894 establishments in Australia